The 2007–08 New Jersey Devils season was the 34th season for the National Hockey League franchise that was established on June 11, 1974, and 26th season since the franchise relocated from Colorado prior to the 1982–83 NHL season. It was the first season the team had played home games anywhere other than Continental Airlines Arena, as the Devils relocated to the newly built Prudential Center in Newark, New Jersey. The season was Brent Sutter's first as head coach.

Pre-season

Regular season

Under new coach Brent Sutter and many roster changes, including the departures of Brian Rafalski and Scott Gomez, the Devils began the first nine games of the season on the road while construction was being finished up at the Prudential Center. The team struggled in the first 19 games, going 7–10–2. The Devils were shut out a league-high 11 times during the regular season. Despite this, they still qualified for the playoffs with 99 points, placing second in the Atlantic Division and fourth in the Eastern Conference.

Divisional standings

Conference standings

Schedule and results

October

Record: 4–6–1; Home: 1–1–0; Road: 3–5–1

November

Record: 9–4–1; Home: 4–3–0; Road: 5–1–1

December

Record: 7–4–1 ; Home: 4–1–0 ; Road: 3–3–1

January

Record: 7–5–0 ; Home: 4–4–0 ; Road: 3–1–0

February

Record: 9–3–3 ; Home: 7–3–1 ; Road: 2–0–2

March

Record: 6–6–1 ; Home: 2–2–1 ; Road: 4–4–0

April

Record: 3–1–0 ; Home: 2–0–0 ; Road: 1–1–0

Playoffs 

The New Jersey Devils clinched a playoff spot following a 2–1 overtime victory against the New York Islanders on April 1, 2008, their 79th game of the season. They were the third team in the East to clinch a spot in the playoffs, and finished fourth in the Eastern Conference with 99 points. This was their 11th consecutive trip to the playoffs, and their 18th overall since making the playoffs for the first time during the 1987–88 season.

The New Jersey Devils played the New York Rangers in the Eastern Conference Quarter-finals, losing the series 4–1, including three losses at their home arena in Newark. This was the fifth meeting between the two clubs.  The Rangers took the first three series, winning 4 games to 3 in the 1992 Patrick Division Semi-finals, 4–3 again in the 1994 Eastern Conference Finals, and 4–1 in the 1997 Eastern Conference Semi-finals. Most recently, the Devils swept the Rangers in the 2006 Eastern Conference Quarter-finals.

* If necessary

Media 
Television coverage was on FSN New York (formerly SportsChannel New York and FOX Sports Net New York) with Mike Emrick and Chico Resch providing play-by-play with Steve Cangialosi and  former Devil Ken Daneyko as color commentators. FSN New York, which was owned by Cablevision which at the time also owned MSG Network, was re-branded MSG Plus the following season. Radio coverage was still on WFAN 660 with Matt Loughlin and Sherry Ross.

Player statistics

Regular season
Scoring

Goaltending

Playoffs
Scoring

Goaltending

Note: GP = Games played; G = Goals; A = Assists; Pts = Points; +/- = Plus/minus; PIM = Penalty minutes; PPG = Power-play goals; SHG = Short-handed goals; GWG = Game-winning goals
      MIN = Minutes played; W = Wins; L = Losses; T/OT = Ties/overtime losses; GA = Goals against; GAA = Goals against average; SO = Shutouts; SA = Shots against; SV = Shots saved; SV% = Save percentage;

Awards and records

Awards

Nominations

Records

Milestones

Transactions
The Devils have been involved in the following transactions during the 2007–08 season.

Trades

Free agents

Draft picks
New Jersey's picks at the 2007 NHL Entry Draft in Columbus, Ohio.

See also
2007–08 NHL season

References

New Jersey Devils seasons
New Jersey Devils
New Jersey Devils
New Jersey Devils
New Jersey Devils
21st century in Newark, New Jersey